Minnal FM is a Malaysian state owned Indian language radio station, owned and operated by Radio Televisyen Malaysia. Most of the show in this radio channel are aired in Tamil Language. But, the channel also air songs in Malayalam, Hindi and Telugu. It was the first 24-hour Indian language broadcast service in the world. It serves as a source of information and entertainment for Malaysian Indians.

Frequency

Radio

Television

References

External links 
 

2005 establishments in Malaysia
Radio stations in Malaysia
Mass media in Kuala Lumpur
Radio stations established in 2005
Tamil-language radio stations
Tamil-language radio stations in Malaysia
Tamil diaspora in Malaysia
Radio Televisyen Malaysia